The 2022 Hawaii House of Representatives elections took place on November 8, 2022, as part of the biennial 2022 United States elections. The process elected all 51 seats in the Hawaii House of Representatives.

The Democrats maintained their majority, winning 45 seats. The Republicans gained two seats in the Hawaii House of Representatives and increased their members from four to six. 

Democrat Scott Saiki was retained as Speaker of the Hawaii House of Representatives.

Members not seeking re-election 
The following state house representatives did not run for re-election:

 Aaron Ling Johanson
 Luella Costales
 Tina Wildberger
 Takashi Ohno

Predictions

Summary of results

Closest races 
Seats where the margin of victory was under 10%:
 
  (gain)
  (gain)

Detailed results

Source for primary results:
Source for general election results:
Note: If a primary election is not listed, then there was not a competitive primary in that district (i.e., only one candidate filed to run).

District 1
Incumbent Democrat Mark Nakashima was automatically reelected without opposition, with no votes recorded.

District 2
Incumbent Democrat Richard Onishi was automatically reelected without opposition, with no votes recorded.

District 3
Democratic Primary

General election

District 4
General election

District 5
General election

District 6
Democratic Primary

General election

District 7
Incumbent Democrat Nicole Lowen was automatically reelected without opposition, with no votes recorded.

District 8
Democratic Primary

General election

District 9
Democratic Primary

Incumbent Democrat Justin Woodson was automatically reelected without opposition, with no votes recorded.

District 10
Incumbent Democrat Troy Hashimoto was automatically reelected without opposition, with no votes recorded.

District 11
Democratic Primary

Republican Primary

General election

District 12
General election

District 13
Democratic Primary

General election

District 14
Democratic Primary

General election

District 15
General election

District 16
General election

District 17
General election

District 18
Incumbent Republican Gene Ward was automatically reelected without opposition, with no votes recorded. This flipped the 18th District from Democrats to Republicans.

District 19
Democratic Primary

General election

District 20
Democratic Primary

Republican Primary

General election

District 21
Republican Primary

General election

District 22
Democratic Primary

General election

District 23
Incumbent Democrat Scott Nishimoto was automatically reelected without opposition, with no votes recorded.

District 24
Democratic Primary

General election

District 25
Democratic Primary

General election

District 26
Democratic Primary

General election

District 27
Democratic Primary

General election

District 28
Democratic Primary

General election

District 29
General election

District 30
Democratic Primary

General election

District 31
Incumbent Democrat Linda Ichiyama was automatically reelected without opposition, with no votes recorded.

District 32
General election

District 33
Democratic Primary

Incumbent Democrat Sam Satoru Kong was automatically reelected without opposition, with no votes recorded.

District 34
Democratic Primary

General election

District 35
Democratic Primary

General election

District 36
Democratic Primary

General election

District 37
Democratic Primary

General election

District 38
General election

District 39
Democratic Primary

Republican Primary

General election

District 40
Democratic Primary

Republican Primary

General election

District 41
Republican Primary

General election

District 42
Democratic Primary

General election

District 43
Republican Primary

General election

District 44
Democratic Primary

General election

District 45
Democratic Primary

Republican Primary

General election

District 46
Democratic Primary

General election

District 47
General election

District 48
General election

District 49
Democratic Primary

General election

District 50
Democratic Primary

General election

District 51
Democratic Primary

General election

References

See also 

2022 Hawaii elections
Hawaii House of Representatives elections
Hawaii House